Moest or MŒST or variation, may refer to:

People
 Franz Welser-Moest (born 1960), Austrian conductor
 Hubert Moest (1877–1953), German filmmaker
 Karl Friedrich Moest (1838–1923), German sculptor

Other uses
 Ministry of Education, Science and Technology (Kenya) (MoEST)

See also

 Moët (disambiguation)
 Most (disambiguation), including Möst
 MEST (disambiguation)